Lee Seung-gi (born January 13, 1987) is a South Korean singer, actor, host and entertainer. He has garnered further recognition as an actor with leading roles in popular dramas such as Brilliant Legacy (2009), My Girlfriend Is a Gumiho (2010), The King 2 Hearts (2012), Gu Family Book (2013), You're All Surrounded (2014), A Korean Odyssey (2017–2018),  Vagabond (2019), and Mouse (2021). He was a member of the first season of weekend variety show 1 Night 2 Days from November 2007 to February 2012, and the host of talk show Strong Heart from October 2009 to April 2012.

Film

Television series

Television show

Web show

Hosting

Music videos

References

South Korean filmographies